Julia Manhard (born 28 August 1987 in Füssen) is a freestyle skier associated with ski cross. She represented Germany at the 2010 Winter Olympics.

References 

1987 births
Living people
Sportspeople from Füssen
German female freestyle skiers
Olympic freestyle skiers of Germany
Freestyle skiers at the 2010 Winter Olympics
Universiade medalists in freestyle skiing
Universiade silver medalists for Germany
Competitors at the 2011 Winter Universiade
21st-century German women